Emperor Ming of Han (15June 28 – 5September 75), born  and also known as  and as , was the second emperor of China's Eastern Han dynasty.

He was the fourth son and second crown prince of Emperor Guangwu.  It was during Emperor Ming's reign that Buddhism began to spread into China.

Emperor Ming was a hard-working, able administrator of the empire who showed integrity and demanded integrity from his officials. He also extended Chinese control over the Tarim Basin and eradicated the Xiongnu influence there, through the conquests of his general Ban Chao.

The reigns of Emperor Ming and his son Emperor Zhang were typically considered the golden age of the Eastern Han Empire and known as the Rule of Ming and Zhang.

Family background
Liu Yang was born in AD28 to Emperor Guangwu and his first love, Consort Yin Lihua.  Emperor Guangwu, then still an official under Gengshi Emperor, had married Yin in 23. After he became emperor in 25, had wanted to create her empress, but she declined because she had no sons at that point.  Instead, she endorsed Consort Guo, who had already had a son (Liu Jiang), and Emperor Guangwu created Consort Guo empress and Prince Jiang crown prince in 26.  However, Prince Yang's birth in 28 was still considered a major event.

As Duke/Prince of Donghai and crown prince
In 39, Emperor Guangwu created all of his sons, other than Crown Prince Jiang, dukes, and Prince Yang was created the Duke of Donghai.  He quickly became known for his intelligence even in his young age, and he often made quick judgments of situations that turned out to be correct.  Emperor Guangwu became very impressed with him.

At the age of 41, Empress Guo had lost favor, and her constant complaints angered Emperor Guangwu.  In 41, he deposed her and made Duke Yang's mother Consort Yin empress instead.  All of the imperial dukes were promoted to princes to accommodate Emperor Guangwu's new title for Empress Guo—Princess Dowager of Zhongshan (after appointing her son Liu Fu the Prince of Zhongshan); Duke Yang was created the Prince of Donghai.

After Empress Guo was deposed, her son, Crown Prince Jiang, became apprehensive about remaining crown prince, and repeatedly requested to be replaced.  Emperor Guangwu was initially hesitant to depose both mother and son, but in 43, he resolved to swap Princes Jiang's and Yang's positions.  He created Prince Jiang the Prince of Donghai, and created Prince Yang crown prince.  At this time, he also changed Prince Yang's name to Zhuang, perhaps because Yang (which means "sun") is such a commonly used character that the law of naming taboo would cause the people too much trouble. The new name was not without its own problems, and many members of the Zhuang clan were forced to change their names.

In 51, the woman who would eventually become his empress – Consort Ma, the youngest daughter of famed general Ma Yuan – would become a consort of his.  She was 12, and he was 23.  She would become a favorite of his, but never bore a son.  Her niece (the daughter of her older sister), Consort Jia, also a consort of Crown Prince Zhuang, did give birth to a child—Liu Da.  At Crown Prince Zhuang's direction, Consort Ma adopted Consort Jia's son as her own.

As crown prince, Crown Prince Zhuang was often requested by Emperor Guangwu to render opinions in important matters.  In 51, he was involved in making a major correct decision in Han's relationship with Xiongnu.  By that point, Xiongnu had a civil war and divided into two—with North Xiongnu ruled by Chanyu Punu and South Xiongnu ruled by Chanyu Bi.  Han had become allied with South Xiongnu, and in response, Chanyu Punu, also wanting peace with Han, requested a heqin marriage.  Prince Zhuang suggested that Emperor Guangwu refuse the proposal, reasoning that North Xiongnu had only made the proposal to alienate South Xiongnu from Han.  Emperor Guangwu agreed.

In 57, Emperor Guangwu died, and Crown Prince Zhuang succeeded to the throne as Emperor Ming.

Early reign
Due to a naming taboo, people with the surname Zhuang (莊) were forced to change their surname to Yan (嚴).

Emperor Ming quickly established himself as a diligent and capable administrator of the empire.  He did many things to try to stamp out corrupt officials, often putting them to death if they were discovered.

One thing traditional historians praised him for was his fair treatment of his brothers by the deposed Empress Guo, treating them as if they were also born of his mother Empress Dowager Yin.  In 58, when his older brother, Prince Jiang of Donghai (the former crown prince) died, he ordered that the princes and major officials to attend Prince Jiang's funeral—a highly unusual honor—at Lucheng (魯城, in modern Jining, Shandong), the capital of Donghai.

In 59, at the suggestion of his brother Liu Cang the Prince of Dongping, Emperor Ming instituted a number of Confucian rituals, in which the emperor personally honored the officials who had helped him, to show humility.

In 60, he created his favorite Consort Ma (who was also a favorite of his mother Empress Dowager Yin) empress, and created her adopted son Prince Da crown prince.

The same year, to honour the generals and officials who had assisted his father Emperor Guangwu in reestablishing the Han Dynasty, Emperor Ming, perhaps echoing what Emperor Xuan had done, had the portraits of 28 of them drawn on a palace tower (known as "Yuntai 28 Generals").  Later, four more portraits were added.  However, Ma Yuan, because he was the father of the empress, did not receive this honor.

During the early part of his reign, North Xiongnu continued to be a constant threat to both Han and her ally South Xiongnu.  Emperor Ming engaged in a variety of military and economic tactics to try to maintain peace with North Xiongnu and was largely successful.  In 65, he established a permanent border defense force, known as the Duliao Army, in charge of protecting the northern boundaries and South Xiongnu, and also to prevent the people of South Xiongnu from defecting to North Xiongnu.

In 66, in what would eventually evolve into one of the first imperial university in Chinese history, Emperor Ming built a Confucian school at the capital Luoyang, for the children of high officials and marquesses.  South Xiongnu nobles' children also attended.

Late reign

The Chu and Huaiyang-related mass executions 
Emperor Ming was, early in his reign, known for his generosity and affection for his brothers.  This, however, apparently caused some of them to engage in behavior that were considered taboo at the time and caused them to be severely punished by Emperor Ming, leading also to two major mass executions that blotted Emperor Ming's reign.

The first of these incidents happened in 66–67 and was relatively bloodless.  The ambitious Prince Jing of Guanglin wanted to be emperor, and he plotted with people under him to rebel.  When he was informed, he confessed, and Emperor Ming initially spared him and permitted him to remain the Prince of Guanglin but stripped his political powers.  However, later Prince Jing hired warlocks to curse Emperor Ming.  After he was discovered, Emperor Ming initially took no action, but in 67 forced Prince Jing to commit suicide.

The next incident would not be so bloodless.  In 70, Prince Ying of Chu—incidentally, the only son of Emperor Guangwu not born of either of his empresses but of Consort Xu—hired warlocks to create golden turtles and jade cranes, and carved characters calling for unusual blessings on them—a major taboo at the time.  Further, he was discovered to have written revolutionary writings.  Emperor Ming did not put him to death, but deposed him from his principality, exiled him, and made him a commoner (but with a small fief of 500 households).  In 71, Prince Ying committed suicide in exile.  However, the investigation did not end.  By Emperor Ming's orders, Prince Ying's associates (but not his family) were harshly tortured and interrogated, and anyone that they named as a coconspirator was arrested and further tortured and interrogated.  The interrogators themselves used this opportunity to falsely accuse many others of conspiracy.  Tens of thousands of people died, either of torture or execution, during the investigation.  Only after Empress Ma's intercession and persuasive petitions by one of the interrogators, Han Lang, did the interrogations taper off.

A similar incident happened in 73, when Prince Yan of Huaiyang was informed to have hired warlocks to curse Emperor Ming.  Several of Prince Yan's associates were executed, and there were also many others who were executed or exiled after Chu-style interrogations were carried out.  Prince Yan himself was not executed, but was demoted from his commandery-level principality to be the Prince of Fulin, with only two counties in his principality.

Campaigns against North Xiongnu and reassertion of suzerainty over Xiyu
In 73, annoyed at North Xiongnu's constant incursions against Han, Emperor Ming commissioned his generals Geng Bing and Dou Gu to lead a major expedition against North Xiongnu.  They only had minor successes, but it demonstrated to North Xiongnu that Han was now in a position to strike back.

Dou, as part of his campaign, sent his assistant Ban Chao to visit the Xiyu (modern Xinjiang and former Soviet central Asia) kingdom of Shanshan (on the eastern edge of the Taklamakan Desert.  (Xiyu kingdoms had long submitted to North Xiongnu's authority, and unable to bear the heavy taxes, had often requested that Han step in and reassert suzerainty that had been established during the Western Han Dynasty, starting with Emperor Wu's reign.  However, they had been constantly rebuffed by Emperors Guangwu and Ming, who judged Han to be not sufficiently strong to engage in a Xiyu campaign.)  Initially, the king of Shanshan was very pleased and welcomed the Han ambassadors as honored guests, but eventually the welcome faded.  Ban realized that North Xiongnu ambassadors must have arrived.  He found out where the North Xiongnu ambassadors were, and, in a night raid, massacred the Xiongnu ambassadors.  The king of Shanshan was shocked but somewhat pleased, and submitted to Han suzerainty once again.

Emperor Ming promoted Ban and commissioned him to next visit Yutian ("Khotan"), then the strongest kingdom in southern Xiyu, which had a strong alliance with North Xiongnu.  Guangde, the King of Yutian, trusted his chief warlock, who demanded Ban's horse.  Ban agreed to give him the horse, and then, when the warlock arrived to pick up the horse, immediately executed him, and sent his head back to Guangde.  Guangde was impressed and submitted to Han's suzerainty. With Yutian having submitted, the Xiyu kingdoms largely all submitted as well.

In 74, Dou and Geng led a major military expedition against a major remaining ally of North Xiongnu, Cheshi (車師, roughly modern Changji Hui Autonomous Prefecture, Xinjiang).  Cheshi submitted, and at Dou's suggestion, the office of the Protector General of Xiyu was reinstituted.  A North Xiongnu expedition in 75 to recapture Cheshi was repelled by Geng Gong, one of the deputies of the protector general.

Death
In 75, Emperor Ming died.  His will ordered that no temple be built for him, and that he only be worshipped as part of the worship of his mother Empress Dowager Yin.  (This became a systematic reform that the rest of the Eastern Han Dynasty emperors largely followed; they did not have separate temples built for themselves, but instead were worshipped along with Emperor Guangwu.  This was a major saving compared to the Western Han system of building a separate temple for each emperor.)  His son Crown Prince Da succeeded to the throne as Emperor Zhang.

Era name
 Yongping 58–75

Family
Consorts and Issue:
 Empress Mingde, of the Ma clan of Fufeng (39–79)
 Guiren, of the Jia clan
 Liu Da, Emperor Xiaozhang (57–88), fifth son
 Princess Pingyang, personal name Nu, second daughter
 Married Feng Shun
 Guiren, of the Yin clan
 Liu Chang, Prince Jie of Liang (d. 98), seventh son
Guiren, of the Qin clan (贵人 秦氏)
Guiren, of the Yan clan (贵人 阎氏)
 Unknown
 Liu Jian, Prince Ai of Qiancheng (d. 61), first son
 Liu Xian, Prince Jing of Chen (d. 97), second son
 Liu Gong, Prince Jing of Pengcheng (d. 117), third son
 Liu Dang, Prince Jing of Lecheng (58–96), fourth son
 Liu Yan, Prince Hui of Xiapi (64–126), sixth son
 Liu Bing, Prince Qing of Huaiyang (d. 87), eighth son
 Liu Chang, Prince Dao of Jiyin (d. 84), ninth son
 Princess Huojia, personal name Ji, first daughter
 Married Feng Zhu, Marquis Yangyi, and had issue (one son)
 Princess Longlü, personal name Ying, third daughter
 Married Geng Xi, Marquis Mouping
 Princess Pingshi, personal name Ci, fourth daughter
 Princess Qinshui, personal name Zhi, fifth daughter
 Married Deng Gan, Marquis Gaomi (d. 95)
 Princess Pinggao, personal name Xiaoji, sixth daughter
 Married Deng Bo, Marquis Chang'an
 Princess Junyi, personal name Zhong, seventh daughter
 Married Wang Du, Marquis Yang
 Princess Wu'an, personal name Hui, eighth daughter
 Married Lai Leng, Marquis Zhengqiang, and had issue (one son)
 Princess Luyang, personal name Chen, ninth daughter
 Princess Leping, personal name Xiaoying, tenth daughter
 Princess Cheng'an, personal name Xiaomin, 11th daughter

Ancestry

See also
 Family tree of the Han Dynasty

References

Zürcher, Erik. 1972. The Buddhist Conquest of China: The Spread and Adaptation of Buddhism in Early Medieval China. Reprint, with additions and corrections. 2 vols. Sinica Leidensia. Leiden: E.J. Brill. First edition, 1959 (see in particular p. 22).

28 births
75 deaths
Eastern Han dynasty emperors
1st-century Chinese monarchs
Emperors from Luoyang
Emperor Guangwu of Han